The Marquette County Courthouse is a government building located at 400 South 3rd Street in Marquette, Michigan. It designated a Michigan State Historic Site in 1976 and was listed on the National Register of Historic Places in 1978. The courthouse was the setting of the 1959 film Anatomy of a Murder, directed by Otto Preminger.

History
In 1857, the first Marquette County courthouse, a wooden Greek Revival structure, was built on this site.  By the turn of the century, that structure had become inadequate.  In 1902, voters approved the issuance of $120,000 worth of bonds to construct a new courthouse.  The earlier structure was moved off the site, and the county hired Marquette architect D. Fred Charlton (Charlton, Gilbert & Demar/Charlton & Kuenzli) to design the new building.  Northern Construction Company of Milwaukee, Wisconsin, was hired to construct the building. The county eventually spent $240,000 to complete the structure; it was completed in 1904.

The courthouse was the site of a famous 1913 libel case, where President Theodore Roosevelt won a judgment against Ishpeming newspaper publisher George Newett. Roosevelt was awarded six cents, "the price of a good newspaper." Another later case tried here inspired John D. Voelker's novel, Anatomy of a Murder.  The 1959 movie version of the novel, directed by Otto Preminger, was filmed in the courthouse.

In 1982–84, the courthouse was renovated at a cost of $2.4 million.  A new courthouse and jail was built nearby, connected by a tunnel, but the 1904 building remains in use.

Architecture and design
The Marquette County Courthouse is a Beaux-Arts and Neoclassical structure, with a central three-story mass flanked by two-story wings.  It is built almost entirely of local sandstone over a steel frame.  A colossal portico covers the entrance, lined with  granite Doric columns from Maine.  A Doric entablature with copper cornice rings the roofline.  A copper dome surmounts the building, and sits above the second-floor courtroom.

Inside, the courtroom is finished with mahogany and marble. Mosaic tiles, wool carpeting, and stained glass fill the building.

References

Buildings and structures in Marquette, Michigan
National Register of Historic Places in Marquette County, Michigan
Neoclassical architecture in Michigan
Government buildings completed in 1904
County courthouses in Michigan
Michigan State Historic Sites
Beaux-Arts architecture in Michigan